Line 19 may refer to:
 Line 19 (Beijing Subway), metro line in Beijing, China
 Line 19 (Hangzhou Metro), metro line in Hangzhou, China
 Line 19 (Shanghai Metro), metro line under planning in Shanghai, China
 Line 19 (Stockholm Metro), one of the three green lines
 Line 19 (São Paulo Metro), a metro line that is being planned